Poul Nielsen can refer to:

 Poul Nielsen, footballer
 Poul Nielsen (footballer, born 1915)
 Poul Nielsen (footballer, born 1895)
 Poul Erik Nielsen, rower